The B. K. School of Business Management is a business schools in the state of Gujarat. It is a postgraduate department of Gujarat University situated in Gujarat University Campus, Ahmedabad.

The school was started in 1976, to serve local students and those who could not afford the higher fees at other schools. The school offers two-year full-time and three-year part-time MBA programs for working executives. It is approved by the All India Council for Technical Education and part of B+ National Assessment and Accreditation Council accreditation. The school receives a grant from the University Grants Commission (UGC), and runs an Industry Institute Partnership cell under the UGC umbrella.

The school started a port management program to cater needs of expanding international business and privatisation of ports in Gujarat.

The school offers two year full-time MBA program and three year MBA part-time program (i.e. evening program for working executives) and offers specialization in finance, marketing and human resources. The school also offer post graduate diploma program in port management and diplomas in finance, human resources, and marketing and advertisement. The school updates courses in response to the demands of industry  and offers placement assistance for graduating students.

Admission process
The school selects the students through the Common Management Admission Test (CMAT), which is a written test, which measures candidates’ quantitative, verbal and analytical skills. The school has consistently attracted the top 90 students out of a pool of more than 40,000 students appearing for CMAT. The test is conducted by All India Council of Technical Education (AICTE) for all business schools in India.

Notes

External links
B. K. School of Business Management - official website

Business schools in Gujarat
Universities and colleges in Ahmedabad
Educational institutions established in 1976
1976 establishments in Gujarat